The deepwater ray (Rajella bathyphila), also called the deepwater skate or abyssal skate, is a species of skate in the family Rajidae.

Distribution

It has been found in seas worldwide, concentrated in the North Atlantic, living on continental slopes and abyssal plains.

Description 

Like all rays, the deepwater ray has a flattened body with broad, wing-like pectoral fins. The dorsal surface of adults is white. The outer edges of pectoral and pelvic fins shade to darker. The upper surface is spinulose, but there are bare patches in the centre of the pectoral fins and on sides of body in adult males.

Behaviour

Juveniles feed on small benthic invertebrates, while larger deepwater rays feed on larger invertebrates and fish. It is parasitised by Echeneibothrium bathyphilum, a cestode tapeworm of the order Rhinebothriidea.

Life cycle 

The deepwater ray is oviparous. The eggs have horn-like projections on the shell. Paired eggs are laid, with embryos feed solely on yolk.

See also

References

External links
 

bathyphila
Fish of the Atlantic Ocean
deepwater ray
Taxa named by Ernest William Lyons Holt
Taxa named by Lucius Widdrington Byrne